A single-chip module (SCM) is a chip package with only one die. Contrast with multi-chip modules, where multiple dies are placed on a chip package.

See also
 System in package (SIP)
 Hybrid integrated circuit
 Chip carrier Chip packaging and package types list
 Multi-chip module (MCM)

Semiconductor packages